Military is a 2003 Indian Tamil-language action drama film directed by Suraj, credited as G. Saisuresh. The film stars Sathyaraj and Rambha. A remake of the Malayalam film Hitler (1996), it was released on 28 February 2003, and became a box office failure.

Plot 

Madhavan, locally known as Military, is a protective brother of five younger sisters: Ammu, Seetha, Nandhini, Kamali and Archana. Their father remarried after his first wife's death, because of that his children does not speak to him. With his second wife, he has two daughters. Ammu, the eldest of Madhavan's sisters, was raped by her widower professor. Madhavan asked Ammu to marry the professor, who was quite old. The other sisters did not know about the matter. Seetha elopes with her cousin Balasubramaniam and they later come to stay in their neighbourhood. Madhavan's enemies try to kill his brother-in-law and put the blame on Madhavan. Luckily, his brother-in-law survives and tells the truth.

Cast

Soundtrack 
The music was composed by Deva, with lyrics written by Kalidasan, Palani Bharathi, Pa. Vijay and Na. Muthukumar.

Release and reception
Military was released on 28 February 2003. Malini Mannath of Chennai Online felt "the remake fails to live up to the original" and added "while remaking it, the makers seem to have lost out on the feel of the original. It’s like they’ve just borrowed the scenes and situations, and rushed through the whole scenario. The natural flow is missing, leading to jerky narration." Sify wrote the film "fails to live up to the original" and that Sathyaraj "fails to make an impression as the elder brother of five sisters".

References

External links 
 

2000s Tamil-language films
2003 action drama films
2003 films
Films scored by Deva (composer)
Indian action drama films
Tamil remakes of Malayalam films